Ganguldeniya Grama Niladhari Division is a Grama Niladhari Division of the Udunuwara Divisional Secretariat of Kandy District of Central Province, Sri Lanka. It has Grama Niladhari Division Code 88.

Haladiwela, Matgamuwa, Hepana, Hiddaulla, Wattappola, Mathgamuwa and Panabokke are located within, nearby or associated with Ganguldeniya.

Ganguldeniya is a surrounded by the Wattappola, Hiddavulla West, Urulewatta, Warakagoda and Hepana Grama Niladhari Divisions.

Demographics

Ethnicity 
The Ganguldeniya Grama Niladhari Division has a Sinhalese majority (100.0%). In comparison, the Udunuwara Divisional Secretariat (which contains the Ganguldeniya Grama Niladhari Division) has a Sinhalese majority (72.7%) and a significant Moor population (24.4%)

Religion 
The Ganguldeniya Grama Niladhari Division has a Buddhist majority (100.0%). In comparison, the Udunuwara Divisional Secretariat (which contains the Ganguldeniya Grama Niladhari Division) has a Buddhist majority (72.0%) and a significant Muslim population (24.5%)

References 

Grama Niladhari Divisions of Udunuwara Divisional Secretariat